Baskeleh-ye Dar Anbar (also Romanized as Bāskeleh-ye Dar Anbār; also known as Dar Anbār) is a village in Gowavar Rural District, Govar District, Gilan-e Gharb County, Kermanshah Province, Iran. At the 2006 census, its population was 447, in 95 families.

References 

Populated places in Gilan-e Gharb County